William Michael Daley (born August 8, 1948) is an American lawyer, politician and former banker. He served as White House Chief of Staff to President Barack Obama, from January 2011 to January 2012. He also served as U.S. Secretary of Commerce, from 1997 to 2000, under President Bill Clinton. He has also served on the executive committee of JPMorgan Chase & Co. Daley was a candidate for Governor of Illinois in the 2014 gubernatorial election, until dropping out of the race on September 16, 2013. He ran in the 2019 Chicago mayoral election but came in third in the first-round voting, and did not advance to the runoff. He served as the Vice Chairman of BNY Mellon from June through October 2019. Since November 13, 2019, Daley has served as the Vice Chairman of Public Affairs for Wells Fargo.

Early life and education
He was born in Chicago, the seventh and youngest child of the late Chicago Mayor Richard J. Daley and Eleanor "Sis" Daley. He is the brother of former Illinois legislator John P. Daley and former Chicago mayor Richard M. Daley.

He graduated from St. Ignatius College Prep in 1966, with a B.A. degree from Loyola University Chicago, and a J.D. degree from John Marshall Law School. Daley later accepted an honorary Doctor of Law degree from John Marshall Law School. Except for a period from 1977 to 1980, during which time he sat on the Advisory Council of Economic Opportunity, he practiced law privately with the firm Daley and George.

Professional career
He became associated with Amalgamated Bank of Chicago, where he was first vice chairman (1989–1990) and then president and chief operating officer (1990–1993). Daley returned to the practice of law, as a partner with the firm Mayer, Brown & Platt from 1993 to 1997.

Daley was appointed to the board of Fannie Mae in 1993 by President Bill Clinton, serving until 1997.

Daley was U.S. Secretary of Commerce from 1997 to 2000. Among other things, Secretary Daley helped usher in the age of E-commerce, ran the 2000 census, expanded minority business development programs, and oversaw a wide range of economic initiatives during one of the strongest economic periods in American history, adding an estimated 23 million jobs. Daley stepped down to run Al Gore's campaign for President in 2000.

In December 2001, Daley was appointed to a newly created position as President of SBC Communications to help reform the company's image. In May 2004, Daley was appointed Midwest Chairman of JPMorgan Chase, following its acquisition of Bank One Corporation. In 2007, Daley was appointed as head of the Corporate Responsibility program, a position he held until 2010. Daley formerly served on the Board of Directors of Boeing, Merck & Co., Boston Properties, and Loyola University Chicago. He is currently a trustee of Northwestern University and is a member of the Council on Foreign Relations. In 2010, he received the Chicago History Museum "Making History Award" for Distinction in Civic Leadership. In 2014, he joined Argentiere Capital as a managing partner.

On November 7, 2019, it was announced that Daley had been appointed to serve as head of Public Affairs at Wells Fargo effective November 13, 2019, and will also serve as one of the company's Vice Chairman. His appointment went into effect as scheduled.

Political career
Daley managed his brother Richard's successful campaign in the 1980 Cook County State's Attorney election.

Clinton administration

In 1993, he served as Special Counsel to the President on issues relating to the passage of the North American Free Trade Agreement (NAFTA).

Presidential politics
Daley resigned as commerce secretary to become general chairman of Vice President Al Gore's presidential campaign, replacing Tony Coelho. He was portrayed in the HBO film Recount, about the Florida election recount of the 2000 presidential election, by actor Mitch Pileggi.

During the 2008 Democratic presidential primaries, Daley was a prominent supporter of Barack Obama. On November 5, 2008, Daley was named to the advisory board of the Obama-Biden Transition Project.

Obama administration

On January 6, 2011, President Barack Obama named Daley as his next White House Chief of Staff, and he took office on January 13, 2011. Daley succeeded Rahm Emanuel, who served as Chief of Staff during the first two years of the President's term and left the position in October 2010 to run to succeed Daley's brother as Mayor of Chicago, and Pete Rouse, who was serving as the interim chief of staff.

In March 2011, speaking for the Obama administration on Meet the Press, Daley said the administration will consider using the Strategic Petroleum Reserve if rising oil prices caused by Arab Spring threaten the U.S. economy. Daley said Obama "is very concerned; we're trying to look at all the possible options." He repeated the administration's stance that there is enough output capacity in the world to deal with any disruptions from Libya.

Daley was photographed in the White House Situation Room photograph taken on May 1, 2011, by Pete Souza. Later in May 2011, he was part of the Presidential State Visit to the United Kingdom.

In October 2011, Daley said he planned to return home to Chicago after President Obama made it through his re-election. "I made a commitment to put the president through his re-election, which I'm confident he will do, and then my wife and I will be back in Chicago."

On January 9, 2012, it was announced that Daley would resign as Obama's Chief of Staff. Jack Lew was announced as his successor.

Post Obama administration
Just after the 2012 presidential election, in the November 8, 2012, issue of the Chicago Tribune, Daley was reported as considering a run in the 2014 election for Governor of Illinois. Daley said "I've thought about it before and I don't take it off the table. I think right now, to be very frank with you, the last thing in the world anybody wants to hear about is a race that's two years down the road." Daley further was quoted as saying: "I'm not closing the door and, I know that sounds like a politician, but the fact of the matter is that these are tough days and I think there's a lot to be done by the Legislature. I don't think it helps right now for people to be out there saying they're going to run and they have a solution at this point. I think we've got to see what the Legislature does."

2014 Illinois gubernatorial campaign

On June 10, 2013, Daley announced via YouTube that he would launch an exploratory committee to run for Governor of Illinois. On July 2, 2013, New York Mayor Michael Bloomberg endorsed Daley for governor. On July 30, 2013, Daley filed documents declaring himself an official candidate to challenge incumbent Governor Pat Quinn in the 2014 Democratic primary. On September 16, 2013, Daley made a surprise announcement that he was exiting the race due to the personal hardships inherent in running a campaign for elected office.

After the election, Bill Daley served as co-chair of the transition team for the incoming Rauner Administration.

In 2018, Daley served as the head of finances for the campaign of gubernatorial candidate Chris Kennedy.

2019 Chicago mayoral campaign

After two-term mayor Rahm Emanuel announced he would not seek reelection, it was reported on September 14, 2018, that Daley would run for mayor of Chicago.

Daley's candidacy made the 2019 election the fourteenth Chicago mayoral election in which a member of his family has been a candidate. William's father won the 1955, 1959, 1963, 1967, 1971, and 1975 elections. His brother won the 1989, 1991, 1995, 1999, 2003, 2007, and was an unsuccessful candidate in the 1983 election. This means that a member of the Daley family participated in all but four of the eighteen Chicago mayoral elections held between 1955 and 2019 (with no member of the Daley family having run in the 1979, 1987, 2011, or 2015 elections).

Among the positions Daley took was support of the city exploring the potential implementation of a commuter tax. He also proposed reducing the size of the Chicago City Council from 50 members to 15.

Daley was one of four mayoral candidates (alongside Gery Chico, Susana Mendoza, and Toni Preckwinkle) that had ties to Alderman Edward M. Burke, whose corruption scandal upended the race for mayor. However, Daley's ties were weaker than the other three, and thus, he was perceived to have suffered the least amount of damage from the scandal of the four.

Daley carried support from the city's business community.

Daley's campaign received endorsements from the editorial boards of the Chicago Tribune, Crain's Chicago Business, and The Chicago Crusader. He received the endorsement of Plumbers Local Union 130 He also received endorsements from politicians Al Gore, Emil Jones, Joseph P. Kennedy II, and Bobby Rush.

Daley's campaign placed an emphasis on fundraising. Daley vastly out-fundraised his opponents. A significant financial contributor to Daley's campaign was Illinois billionaire Kenneth C. Griffin. Griffin's financial support of Daley's campaign proved controversial for Daley, largely because Griffin had also been a major financial backer of the failed 2018 reelection campaign of Republican former Illinois governor Bruce Rauner.

Daley's strong fundraising enabled him to run highly visible advertising.

Daley ran a weaker field operation than some other candidates did.

In the last several weeks of the campaign, Daley began to rise in the polls. However, he also began to be the subject of attack ads run by the union-affiliated Fight Back for a Better Tomorrow Super PAC. At the end of the election campaign, polls showed Daley having strong prospects of finishing near the top of the field.

Daley placed third in the election, failing to advance to the runoff. He won 82,294 votes, 14.78% the overall votes cast in the first round. The margin between him and second-place finisher Toni Preckwinkle was 7,049 votes.

Personal life
In 2010, Daley married Bernadette Keller. Keller is an organ donor. She is a founding member and director of the Chicago Transplant Ethics Consortium  

In 2006, Keller bought a 2,052-square-foot apartment in the Park Tower on North Michigan Avenue for $1.48 million. The couple sold the unit in 2015 for $1.4 million. They currently live in a four-bedroom condo on North Lake Shore Drive.

He has four children. Today, his three adult children and three grand-daughters all live in Chicago.

References

External links
 Daley for Mayor official campaign site
 
 Profile at Forbes
 William Daley collected news and commentary at the Chicago Tribune
 Brother Bill: A Look at William Daley at Chicago Magazine, February 2005
 Obama Taps William Daley for Chief of Staff – video report by Democracy Now!
 Wall Street Journal – Why Obama Chose Bill Daley

|-

|-

1948 births
20th-century American politicians
21st-century American politicians
American bankers
American chief operating officers
American people of Irish descent
American pharmacologists
Boeing people
Clinton administration cabinet members
American corporate directors
Daley family
De La Salle Institute alumni
Illinois Democrats
Illinois lawyers
John Marshall Law School (Chicago) alumni
JPMorgan Chase people
Lawyers from Chicago
Living people
Loyola University Chicago alumni
Obama administration cabinet members
Politicians from Chicago
St. Ignatius College Prep alumni
United States presidential advisors
United States Secretaries of Commerce
White House Chiefs of Staff
People associated with Mayer Brown